Sun Bo may refer to:

Sun Bo (executive) (孙波; born 1961), former General Manager of China Shipbuilding Industry Corporation
Sun Bo (footballer) (孙铂; born 1991), Chinese footballer
Sun Bo (writer),  Canadian writer and editor of Chinese descent